CTV Life Channel is a Canadian English language discretionary specialty channel owned by Bell Media. The channel primarily broadcasts factual and reality programming on lifestyle topics such as cooking, home improvement and real estate, along with scripted drama series.

The channel was originally established in 2013 by Knight Enterprises as the Category B service Gusto TV. In May 2016, Knight sold Canadian rights to the Gusto brand and associated programming to Bell Media. The company would relaunch the channel on September 1, using a Category A license formerly used by its music and entertainment channel M3 (formerly MuchMoreMusic, which was launched in 1998 by CHUM Limited).

As part of a rebranding of several Bell Media-owned specialty channels, the channel rebranded as CTV Life Channel on September 12, 2019.

History

Under Knight Enterprises 
In October 2010, Chris Knight was granted approval by the Canadian Radio-television and Telecommunications Commission (CRTC) to operate "MmmTV", described as "a national, English‑language Category 2 specialty programming service devoted to luxury, from vacations and leisure activities to home furnishings and fashion."

In the summer and fall of 2013, several media outlets began reporting on aspects of the channel, now branded as Gusto TV, and its founder, Chris Knight, owner of Knight Enterprises. In several reports, it indicated the launch of the channel on December 11, 2013. This was confirmed, when on December 5, an official press release was issued by Knight Enterprises.

On August 29, 2015, Gusto TV broadcast Live Feed, a live broadcast of footage from the kitchen of the Beckta Dining and Wine Bar in Ottawa. It was described by the network as an example of slow television.

Under Bell Media 

On May 4, 2016, Knight Enterprises announced that it had sold Canadian rights to the Gusto TV brand to Bell Media and that the current channel would be shut down and replaced by a new version of the service under Bell Media ownership. The brand's parent company, Gusto Worldwide Media (GWM), will license Gusto TV's current programming to Bell in addition to producing future series for the channel. GWM will continue to own international rights to the Gusto brand and announced plans to launch an internet television service under the brand in 2017. Gusto re-launched on September 1, 2016, replacing Bell Media's entertainment and music network M3 under its existing Category A license and channel allotments.

On June 7, 2018, during the CTV upfronts, it was announced that Gusto would be re-branded as "CTV Life", as part of a re-branding of several Bell Media specialty channels under the CTV name. The following year, it was revealed the channel would rebrand as CTV Life Channel on September 12, 2019. Bell also announced an output deal with Mike Holmes and his studio, under which CTV Life Channel would air his future productions (such as the new series Holmes 911), and acquire reruns of his past series (such as Holmes on Homes).

Programming 

 A is for Apple
 A Place in the Sun: Home or Away
 Amazing Wedding Cakes
 Beeny's Restoration Nightmare
 Ben's Menu
 The Block
 Bones
 Building the Dream
 Chefs of the James Beard House
 Chinese Food Made Easy
 Cook Eat China
 Cook Like A Chef
 Darren Robertson's Charcoal Kitchen
 Delicious Iceland
 The Delicious Miss Dahl
 Double Your Dish
 The Edible Road Show
 Escape to the Country
 Essence of India
 Fast, Fresh, Simple
 Fish the Dish
 Flour Power
 Food and Drink
 The French Chef
 French Food Safari
 The Great Canadian Food Show
 Heston's Great British Food
 Holmes 911
 Holmes on Homes
 The House That £100k Built
 The House That £100k Built: Tricks of the Trade
 The Incredible Spice Men
 Indian Food Made Easy
 James Martin's United Cakes of America
 Jamie's 15 Minute Meals
 Jamie's 30 Minute Meals
 Jamie: Keep Cooking and Carry On
 Joe Pera Talks with You
 Jonathan Phang's Gourmet Trains
 Junk Brothers
 License to Grill
 Luke Nguyen's United Kingdom
 The Marilyn Denis Show
 Martha Bakes
 Martha and Snoop's Potluck Dinner Party
 Martha Stewart's Cooking School
 Mary Makes It Easy
 MasterChef Australia
 MasterChef Canada
 My Kitchen Rules
 Nigel Slater's Dish of the Day
 One World Kitchen
 Paddock to Plate
 Paul and Nick's Big Food Trip
 PopLife
 Rachel Allen's Cake Diaries
 Rachel Khoo's Kitchen Cookbook: Cosmopolitan Cook
 The Real Girl's Kitchen
 The Restoration Man
 Rick Stein
 Road Grill
 Roux Scholarship
 Sachie's Kitchen
 Street Food Around the World
 Supermarket Sweep UK
 Tareq Taylor's Nordic Cookery
 There's No Taste Like Home
 Where to I Do?

References

External links
 

2013 establishments in Canada
Bell Media networks
CTV Television Network
Digital cable television networks in Canada
English-language television stations in Canada
Television channels and stations established in 2013